Cary Selden Rodman (February 19, 1909 – November 2, 2002) was a prolific American writer of poetry,  plays and prose, political commentary, art criticism, Latin American and Caribbean history, biography and travel writing—publishing a book almost every year of his adult life, he also co-edited Common Sense magazine.

Biography

Background

Born on February 19, 1909, to architect Cary Selden Rodman and Nannie Van Nostrand (Marvin). He had one sibling, Nancy Gardiner Macdonald, who married Dwight Macdonald in 1934. He attended The Loomis Institute and Yale University. With William Harlan Hale, he was founder and editor of the campus magazine The Harkness Hoot (1930–31). Following university, he edited, with Alfred Mitchell Bingham, the political monthly Common Sense (1932–43). He served as Master Sgt. O.S.S. in the U.S. Army (1943–45).

Poet and anthologist

Rodman was first published as a poet in 1932. Mortal Triumph and Other Poems was followed by narrative poems and the verse play The Revolutionists in 1942. His last book of poetry, Death of a Hero, published in 1964, imagines the scene of the plane crash and death of Sir Frederick Banting, discoverer of insulin, and was illustrated  by the artist, Seymour Leichman.

Editor of seminal anthologies, A New Anthology of Modern Poetry, was 'the first anthology of its kind to include Negro folk-songs, light verse and satire, choruses from the experimental theater and a sound-track from a pioneer movie'. 100 American Poems included lyric, epic and ballad works from colonial times through 1948.

Common Sense
Selden Rodman and Alfred Bingham co-edited the socialist magazine for around a decade between 1932 and 1943. Serving as a monthly periodical with the mission statement "A monthly magazine of positive social action devoted to the elimination of war and poverty through democratic planning for abundance," Common Sense saw the likes of contributors such as Charles A. Beard, Thomas Hart Benton, Upton Sinclair, and others. They published articles with a wide range from historical reviews of arguments, opinionated editorials, general news articles, poetry, book and periodical reviews, advertisements for socialist pamphlets, and reader responses to previous editions. Selden and Alfred communicated virtually daily on the issues that were pertinent to the months edition, whom to have write a piece, how radical they wanted to make the magazine, what other periodicals were producing, and how to address those issues if needed.

Personal and death

Rodman married his first wife, Eunice Clark, in 1933, and his second wife, Hilda Clausen, in 1938. In 1950 he married Maia Wojciechowska and their daughter Oriana, was born in 1951. He married Carole Cleaver in 1962 and with her had two children, Carla and Van Nostrand.

He died on November 2, 2002, in Ridgewood, New Jersey.

Legacy

Popular art and Haiti

Regarding self-taught, naïve, and primitive artists he admired, Rodman said, '...by their intuitive grasp of the principles of composition, color, and accommodation to the flatness of the picture-plane, (they) achieve the same quality of timelessness as the Masters. There is the same sense of arrested mobility; the same transformation of the humble into the noble, the here-and-now into forever.'

The 1946 monograph, Horace Pippin, A Negro Painter in America, was the first book ever published about the black, self-taught, American artist, and the biography, Horace Pippin, The Artist as a Black American, was the first biography of the artist.

Renaissance in Haiti, published in 1948, was the first book about Haitian art and the artists who were to become the first generation of the art movement in Haiti, including the vodum priest, Hector Hyppolite and popular realist, Philome Obin. Working alongside DeWitt Peters, founder of the Centre d' Art, Rodman initiated and directed the mural paintings in the Episcopal Cathedral Ste. Trinite in Port-au-Prince. The cathedral and murals were destroyed in the earthquake of 2010.

Haiti, The Black Republic was published in 1954 and Rodman continued writing about Haiti throughout his life. He maintained a home in Jacmel, Haiti in the 1980s and 90's  where he spent the winters with his family and ran a gallery called 'Renaissance II'.

While writing a series of travel and history books in the 1960s and 1970s, Rodman visited Mexico, Central and South America and the Caribbean, adding works of popular art to his collection. In 1983 Ramapo College in Mahwah, NJ, accepted the gift of The Selden Rodman Collection of Popular Art whose range included 'self-taught' and 'outsider' artists from North America as well.

Conversations and journals

Several of Rodman's books were collections of conversations he had with literary and art figures of his time, including, among many others, Robert Frost, Ernest Hemingway and Norman Mailer in Tongues of Fallen Angels, and Jackson Pollock, Willem de Kooning, Mark Rothko, David Smith, Philip Johnson, Frank Lloyd Wright, Alexander Calder, Edward Hopper, Leonard Baskin and others in Conversations with Artists.

His journals, dating from 1938 to 2000, contain handwritten accounts of his personal life, travels, and conversations with writers and artists which were later used for many published works. The Selden Rodman Papers are housed in the Yale University Library Manuscripts and Archives.

Humanist

The first paragraph of The Insiders, published in 1960, reads, 'We live in an apocalyptic age, but we are not the first to do so. Apocalyptic periods before us have produced great works of the spirit—works which signaled an emergence from the darkness. Other times of crisis yielded supinely and left the record of their despair in the labyrinthine decoration or tinkling symbol.' 

Throughout his life and writings, Rodman fiercely argued for artists to search '...for images of truth that will be meaningful to his contemporaries.' And concluded, 'The value of the finished product will be determined finally by the judgement of those to whose hearts it addresses itself.'

Works

 Mortal Triumph and Other Poems  – 1932
 A New Anthology of Modern Poetry  – 1938
 The Revolutionists, A Verse Play  – 1942
 Horace Pippin, A Negro Painter in America  – 1947
 Renaissance in Haiti  – 1948
 Haiti: The Black Republic  – 1954
 The Eye of Man  – 1955
 Conversations with Artists  – 1957
 Mexican Journal: The Conquerors Conquered - 1958
 The Insiders  – 1960
 The Heart of Beethoven  – 1962
 Death of the Hero  – 1964
 The Mexico Traveler  – 1969
 South America of the Poets  – 1970
 Tongues of Fallen Angels  –  1972
 Horace Pippin, The Artist as a Black American, with Carole Cleaver – 1972
 The Miracle of Haitian Art – 1974
 Genius in the Backlands  – 1977
 Artists in Tune with Their World  – 1982
 Where Art is Joy, Haitian Art: The First 40 Years  – 1988
 Geniuses & Other Eccentrics'' – 1997

References

External sources
 
Common Sense October 1939
University of Wyoming American Heritage Center Collection 4259 "Selden Rodman Papers" Box 1 Folders 26-7

External links 

 Stuart A. Rose Manuscript, Archives, and Rare Book Library, Emory University: Selden Rodman collection, 1938-1959

1909 births
2002 deaths
Loomis Chaffee School alumni
Yale University alumni
American male poets
Writers from Manhattan
20th-century American poets
American emigrants to Haiti
20th-century American male writers